Microctenopoma is a genus of fish in the Anabantidae (climbing gourami) family. They are native to Africa. Microctenopoma has been included in Ctenopoma in the past; unlike that genus, they are bubblenest builders, and the males defend the eggs and fry until they are free swimming.

The currently recognized species in this genus are:
 Microctenopoma ansorgii (Boulenger, 1912) (ornate ctenopoma)
 Microctenopoma congicum (Boulenger, 1887) (Congo ctenopoma)
 Microctenopoma damasi (Poll & Damas, 1939)
 Microctenopoma fasciolatum (Boulenger, 1899) (banded ctenopoma)
 Microctenopoma intermedium (Pellegrin, 1920)
 Microctenopoma lineatum (Nichols, 1923)
 Microctenopoma milleri (S. M. Norris & M. E. Douglas, 1991)
 Microctenopoma nanum (Günther, 1896) (dwarf ctenopoma)
 Microctenopoma nigricans S. M. Norris, 1995
 Microctenopoma ocellifer (Nichols, 1928)	 
 Microctenopoma pekkolai (Rendahl (de), 1935)	 
 Microctenopoma uelense S. M. Norris & M. E. Douglas, 1995

References

 
Anabantidae
Freshwater fish genera

Taxonomy articles created by Polbot